Ernie Bateman (5 April 1929 – 18 September 2018) was an English professional footballer who played in the Football League as a centre half for Watford. He joined the club from Hemel Hempstead in 1952 and made 52 league appearances in the 1955–56 and 1956–57 seasons, before returning to non-league football with Sittingbourne.

Bateman's younger brother Colin also played for the same three clubs.

He died in 2018.

References

1929 births
2018 deaths
Association football central defenders
English footballers
Footballers from Hertfordshire
Sportspeople from Hemel Hempstead
Hemel Hempstead Town F.C. players
Sittingbourne F.C. players
Watford F.C. players